This is a list of ecoregions in Romania.

Terrestrial
Romania is in the Palearctic realm. Ecoregions are listed by biome.

Temperate broadleaf and mixed forests
 Balkan mixed forests
 East European forest steppe
 Pannonian mixed forests

Temperate coniferous forests
 Carpathian montane conifer forests

Temperate grasslands, savannas, and shrublands
 Pontic Steppe

Freshwater
 Dniester - Lower Danube

Marine
 Black Sea

References
 Abell, R., M. Thieme, C. Revenga, M. Bryer, M. Kottelat, N. Bogutskaya, B. Coad, N. Mandrak, S. Contreras-Balderas, W. Bussing, M. L. J. Stiassny, P. Skelton, G. R. Allen, P. Unmack, A. Naseka, R. Ng, N. Sindorf, J. Robertson, E. Armijo, J. Higgins, T. J. Heibel, E. Wikramanayake, D. Olson, H. L. Lopez, R. E. d. Reis, J. G. Lundberg, M. H. Sabaj Perez, and P. Petry. (2008). Freshwater ecoregions of the world: A new map of biogeographic units for freshwater biodiversity conservation. BioScience 58:403-414, .
 Spalding, Mark D., Helen E. Fox, Gerald R. Allen, Nick Davidson et al. "Marine Ecoregions of the World: A Bioregionalization of Coastal and Shelf Areas". Bioscience Vol. 57 No. 7, July/August 2007, pp. 573–583.

 *
Romania
ecoregion